The Hunger Games is a trilogy of adventure novels by Suzanne Collins.

The Hunger Games may also refer to:

The Hunger Games (novel), the first novel in the trilogy
The Hunger Games (film series), the film series based on the novels
The Hunger Games (film), the first film in the series
The Hunger Games: Songs from District 12 and Beyond, the soundtrack to the first film